The Curse of Clyde Langer is a two-part story of The Sarah Jane Adventures which was broadcast on CBBC on 10 and 11 October 2011. It is the second story of the fifth and final series.

Plot

Part 1
At school, Clyde shows Rani The Silver Bullet, a comic he made. While Sarah Jane has a talk with Haresh on Sky's first day at school, a strange storm interrupts the meeting—fish begin to fall out of the sky. Mr Smith later explains that raining fish is a natural, if unusual, phenomenon, though the fish that day were abnormally large. Thinking it might be related to a legend involving an old Mojave totem pole now on display in a local museum, the gang visits the exhibition. Outside the museum, Clyde gives a homeless girl some money, explaining to Sky that it probably is not her fault she is out in the streets. Disregarding signs not to touch the exhibits, Clyde gets a splinter from the totem pole they have come to see.

Dr Madigan, the anthropologist in charge, explains the legend of the totem pole. Hetocumtek was a vicious god who fell out of the skies and tried to enslave the Mojave. The Native American medicine men imprisoned the god inside the totem pole. Sarah Jane suspects that Hetocumtek was an alien masquerading as a warrior god. However, a scan detects no alien signs of any kind.

That night, Clyde finishes his comic and signs his name on it before falling asleep. He fails to notice that his name on all of his documents, including his comic, mysteriously begins to glow orange.

Walking to Sarah Jane's house, Clyde shows her The Silver Bullet. She at first takes interest in his comic, but at the mention of his name, Clyde's name glows orange in Sarah Jane's eye. Suddenly, she takes a dislike to Clyde, ordering him to leave her house. In front of the Chandras' residence, Clyde tries to tell Rani and Haresh the problem he had with Sarah Jane, only to face the same conflict when Haresh says his name. Haresh expels him from school, and Rani says she hates him. It turns out Clyde was cursed by the totem pole, and if anyone says his name, they will immediately hate him, leaving him isolated.

Getting ready for her first day of school, Sky enters the attic. Sarah Jane tells her she will return to the museum to see if there are any connections between the totem pole and the fish incident. When Sky mentions Clyde to Sarah Jane, she tells her to stay away from him. Unaffected by the curse, Sky notices the sudden hatred Sarah Jane has for Clyde.

At the park, Clyde is treated kindly by his old friend Steve until his name is said. Barely escaping from Steve and his gang, he enters the museum. While he is asking Dr Madigan about curses, Sarah Jane enters the museum and advises her to keep away from Clyde. Now under the curse's influence, Dr Madigan orders the security guards to throw him out.

Clyde returns home where he sees his mother, Carla, staring at an envelope addressed to him. She says he has ruined her life and tells him to leave. Realizing what has happened, he begs Carla to let him stay. When the police arrive in response to a complaint from Sarah Jane, he runs away. When he tries to make a withdrawal from an ATM, the screen fills with repetitions of his name. Out in the streets in the rain, the homeless girl Clyde helped offers to assist him, holding out her hand, which he takes.

Part 2
The mysterious girl on the streets introduces herself as Ellie. Fearing the curse, Clyde introduces himself as Enrico Box taking inspiration from a nearby pizza box. Ellie tells him how many homeless people mysteriously disappear because of the Night Dragon.

When lightning bursts out of the totem pole at the museum. Sarah Jane is called in to investigate. Scanning, she detects alien energy and sees the eyes of one of the faces glow orange. At school, Sky wonders why Sarah Jane and Rani cannot explain why they now hate Clyde. Back in the attic, Sarah Jane suddenly tears up. The same thing occurs to Rani later, as well as to Carla when Sky visits her. All of them feel as if they are missing a big part of their life.

Clyde and Ellie visit Mystic Mags, a homeless psychic, who tells them something worse than the Night Dragon is coming, something that has put a curse on Clyde.  Back at the museum the totem pole causes a violent thunderstorm as the faces begin to come to life. Sheltering from the rain, Clyde and Ellie connect with each other, keeping themselves warm by burning The Silver Bullet.

Back in the attic, Sarah Jane and Rani share their feelings of distress. After being informed that Hetocumtek is getting stronger, Sky guesses that Clyde activated the warrior god when he got the splinter, creating the curse. She realizes that as long as Clyde is out in the streets, the alien warrior god will get stronger. She also sees that his name is the key to stopping Hetocumtek and convinces Sarah Jane and Rani to say Clyde's name repeatedly, which breaks the curse.

Clyde draws a portrait of Ellie and shows it to her. She then kisses him and leaves to get coffee, telling him she will be back. Sarah Jane and the gang arrive and bring Clyde to the attic, although he doesn't want to leave Ellie. Mr Smith transports the totem pole to the attic where it begins to fight back. Clyde, holding onto the pole, angrily blames it for ruining his life and shouts, "My name is Clyde Langer!" disintegrating the pole.

Free of the curse and welcomed back by his friends and family, Clyde searches for Ellie. He asks many of the homeless people, but they do not know where or who she is. Clyde suggests they use Mr Smith to track her, but Rani points out her name on a poster, indicating that Ellie is not her real name. As a truck with the name "Night Dragon Haulage" drives by, one of the homeless men explains that the driver occasionally would take people to other places for a better life. At night in his room, Clyde reminisces about Ellie as he stares at his portrait of her.

Cast Notes 
Jocelyn Jee Esien previously appeared as Carla Langer in The Mark of the Berserker and The Empty Planet.
Angela Pleasence appeared in the Doctor Who episode "The Shakespeare Code" as Elizabeth I.
Sara Houghton is the daughter of Doctor Who writer Don Houghton.

Broadcast 
The first part was broadcast on Monday 11 October 2011 on CBBC while the second was broadcast on the following day, Tuesday 12 October 2011, on CBBC. 
The two parts were then again broadcast on Thursday 17 November and Friday 18 November 2011 on BBC One and for the first time in HD on BBC One HD.

References

External links

2011 British television episodes
The Sarah Jane Adventures episodes
Fiction about curses
Totem poles
Television episodes about homelessness